William Vukelić (born 1998) is a Croatian alpine ski racer.

He competed at the 2015 World Championships in Beaver Creek, USA, in the giant slalom. His first FIS World Cup race was on March 4 in Kranjska Gora, Slovenia where he finished 62nd with nearly 4 seconds behind eventual winner Alexis Pinturault. His starting number was 75.

References

1998 births
Croatian male alpine skiers
Living people